Cox is a municipality in the comarca of Vega Baja del Segura in the Valencian Community, Spain.

This town is located at the feet of the Sierra de Callosa mountain range.

References

Municipalities in the Province of Alicante
Vega Baja del Segura